"Rock Me Gently" is a song by Andy Kim, released as a single in 1974.

The Canadian singer, who charted several hits from 1968 to 1971, had not had a top 100 single since September 1971, and had been without a record label since early 1973. Nevertheless, he said in a 1974 interview, "I never mentally admitted defeat in spite of three years off the charts." He formed his own label, Ice Records, and personally financed the recording session that produced "Rock Me Gently". He could afford to record only two sides, and deciding the second side was good enough to be an A-side, he put an instrumental of "Rock Me Gently" on its B-side.

The single impressed Capitol Records executives, who signed Kim to a deal. "Rock Me Gently" debuted on the Hot 100 on June 22, 1974, and took 14 weeks to reach No. 1 on September 28. It also rose to No. 2 on the UK Singles Chart and No. 10 in Ireland, and remains his only charting song in either the UK or Ireland. Even the instrumental B-side received substantial airplay on R&B stations. It would be Kim's last top 10 hit in either country.

Personnel
 Backing Vocals - Carol Carmichael And Group
 Bass - Max Bennett
 Concertmaster - Sid Sharp
 Conductor - Michael Omartian
 Drums - Ed Greene
 Guitars - Andy Kim, Ben Benay, Dean Parks, Larry Carlton
 Keyboards - Michael Omartian
 Percussion - Gary Coleman

Chart performance

Weekly charts

Year-end charts

Later uses
Part of the song was used in a 1970s UK TV commercial for Lever Brothers' Jif cleaning cream, using the lyric "When Jif’s your cleaner / Tough dirt goes / Away so gently / And it shows / Your home has never been loved like this before".

The song resurfaced in 2008 in a television commercial for Jeep Liberty. It was also played at the end (and titles) of season 4 finale and in the season 5 premiere of the TV show Ray Donovan.

The song appears in season 3, episode 3 of Sex Education.

Michelle Wright version

In 1989, Canadian country singer Michelle Wright released a version as a single on her debut album, Do Right By Me.  It reached No. 7 on the Canadian RPM country singles chart.

Chart performance

Year-end charts

See also
List of Billboard Hot 100 number-one singles of 1974

References

1974 singles
1974 songs
1989 singles
Andy Kim songs
Billboard Hot 100 number-one singles
Cashbox number-one singles
Capitol Records singles
Michelle Wright songs
Songs written by Andy Kim